The Barbour House is an early 20th-century mansion in Fairfax, Virginia. It takes its name from its prominent owner, John Strode Barbour. Barbour House is located at 4069 Chain Bridge Road.

History 
Barbour House was the residence of John Strode Barbour (10 August 1866 – 6 May 1952), a prominent American newspaper editor, lawyer, mayor, and statesman. Barbour was a scion of the Barbour political family. During the Barbours' ownership, the Barbour House was the center of Fairfax social life.

When the estate of Barbour's widow, Mary B. Grimsley Barbour, was in administration, the Barbour House was being scheduled for demolition so that the property could be developed. McCandlish and Lillard law firm bought the house and moved it to a parcel of the estate fronting on Payne Street (which was renamed Chain Bridge Road). William Patram, a well-known building mover, transported Barbour House 100 yards to its new site.

References

Houses completed in the 20th century
Barbour family residences
Houses in Fairfax, Virginia